Vladimir Nikolayevich Gorbatovsky (May 26, 1851 – July 30, 1924) was an Imperial Russian army commander. He fought in the wars against the Ottoman Empire and the Empire of Japan.

Gorbatovsky commanded the Twelfth Army during the Lake Naroch offensive.

Awards
Order of Saint Stanislaus (House of Romanov), 3rd class, 1876
Order of Saint Anna, 3rd class, 1878
Order of Saint Stanislaus (House of Romanov), 2nd class, 1879
Order of Saint Anna, 2nd class, 1883
Order of Saint Vladimir, 4th class, 1888
Order of Saint Vladimir, 3rd class, 1896
Order of Saint Anna, 1st class, 1904
Order of Saint Stanislaus (House of Romanov), 1st class, 1904
Order of Saint George, 4th degree, 1904
Order of Saint Vladimir, 2nd class, 1905
Order of the White Eagle (Russian Empire), 1911
Order of Saint George, 3rd degree (September 28, 1914)

References

External links
 Страница на «Хроносе»
 Биография.ру
 СПИСОК генералам, офицерам и классным чинам Гренадерского корпуса, участвовавшим в сражении под Плевной 28-го ноября 1877 г.

1851 births
1924 deaths
Russian military personnel of the Russo-Turkish War (1877–1878)
Russian military personnel of the Russo-Japanese War
Russian military personnel of World War I
People of the Russian Civil War
Recipients of the Order of Saint Stanislaus (Russian), 3rd class
Recipients of the Order of St. Anna, 3rd class
Recipients of the Order of Saint Stanislaus (Russian), 2nd class
Recipients of the Order of St. Anna, 2nd class
Recipients of the Order of St. Vladimir, 4th class
Recipients of the Order of St. Vladimir, 3rd class
Recipients of the Order of St. Anna, 1st class
Recipients of the Order of Saint Stanislaus (Russian), 1st class
Recipients of the Order of St. Vladimir, 2nd class
Recipients of the Order of the White Eagle (Russia)
Recipients of the Order of St. George of the Third Degree